= Tarwai =

Village in Allahabad, Uttar Pradesh, India

Coordinates: 25°16′N 82°08′E

Tarwai is a village in Prayagraj, Uttar Pradesh, India.
